, known as Hajime Saito in the English-language anime dubs, is a fictional character  from the Rurouni Kenshin manga and anime series created by Nobuhiro Watsuki. Being a fan of the Shinsengumi, Watsuki created Saitō as an anti-heroic and a foil to Himura Kenshin, the main character of the story,  while basing him on the real life Shinsengumi member of the same name.

During the Bakumatsu, he had a long time rivalry with Himura Kenshin, an assassin of the Imperialist cause. In the series, he is initially introduced as an antagonist who encounters and once again duels with Kenshin. It is later revealed that Saitō, who had only been testing Kenshin's strength, is now a spy agent working for the Meiji Government. After the reveal, Saitō becomes one of the main protagonists of the series, forming an uneasy alliance with Kenshin.

Saitō appears in the featured movies of the series, as well as the original video animation (OVA) series and other media relating to the franchise, including a wide range of electronic games. He has also been one of the most popular characters of the Rurouni Kenshin series, ranking near the top of the series' popularity polls. His character is featured in various types of merchandising developed for the series, such as figurines and key-chains. Several anime and manga publications have commented on Saitō's character.

Creation and conception 

Nobuhiro Watsuki based Saitō Hajime on the actual historic figure of the same name who was the captain of the third squad of the Shinsengumi in the Meiji era. Watsuki altered the character to a higher degree than the other historic figures who appear in Rurouni Kenshin since the character Saitō has a greater role in the story than the other characters. In the development of Rurouni Kenshin Watsuki planned for Saitō to be a "dirty" hero who maintains his "Swift Death to Evil" policy and does not become friendly with Kenshin's group, being rather aloof to them. Hajime has no specific model for his design. Since Watsuki intended for the character Saitō to be a villain, he made the character's face "villain-ish."

Watsuki considers Saitō as the "curse" of the villains in the series since he defeats the enemies who consider themselves the strongest. Watsuki gave Saitō's left-handed technique the name "Gatotsu" to fit with the action comic theme.

In July 2006, the Japanese publishers of Rurouni Kenshin released the kanzenban edition. In the sixth kanzenban volume, Watsuki included a draft page featuring a redesigned appearance of Saitō's character.

In the anime adaptation of Rurouni Kenshin, Watsuki's designs of Saitō were combined with the talents of voice actor Hirotaka Suzuoki, who also voiced Saitō in the original video animations and Rurouni Kenshin: The Motion Picture. However, due to Suzuoki's death in 2006, he was replaced by Ken Narita as the new voice actor for Saitō in the two-part Rurouni Kenshin: New Kyoto Arc movies.

Appearances

In Rurouni Kenshin
A powerful and ruthless swordsman, Saitō lives by the code , and frequently fights using the Gatotsu, a special left-handed stab variant of the Hirazuki technique of the Shinsengumi, and its different stances. During his time in the Shinsengumi, he was a close associate of fellow Shinsengumi member and first squad captain Okita Sōji, and also developed a rivalry with the pro-Imperialist Himura Kenshin. Kenshin said that he and Saito, and Okita, and Shinpachi, had fought with each other 3 times, but none had never finished At the end of the Bakumatsu, the pro-shogunate forces were ultimately defeated and Saitō was forced to go into hiding. Saitō is also married to a woman named , who does not appear in the story.

In his introduction to the series, Saitō attacks and injures Sagara Sanosuke. Saitō has been hired by Shibumi, a corrupt politician, to kill Kenshin; thus, his attack on Sanosuke serving as a warning to Kenshin. While Kenshin is dueling Shibumi's assassin Akamatsu Arundo, Saitō appears at the Kamiya dojo, using his alias "Fujita Gorō", and poses as a police officer who urgently needs to speak with Kenshin. When Kenshin returns, upon recognizing Saitō, he reveals Saitō's true identity as the former Shinsengumi third squad captain. They fight, and just as they are about to kill each other, Ōkubo Toshimichi appears and stops the duel, revealing that Saitō was only testing Kenshin's abilities to see if he was skilled enough to face Shishio Makoto. Having revealed his true allegiance with Ōkubo, Saitō postpones the duel, and leaves to kill Shibumi and Arundo.

Saitō then travels to Kyoto to fight Shishio under government orders. Along with Kenshin and Sanosuke, he assaults Shishio's battleship, the Purgatory. Accepting Shishio's challenge to fight on Mount Hiei, Saitō kills Uonuma Usui, one of the Ten Swords, and later ambushes Shishio, almost, but failing to kill him as Shishio had been wearing a hachigane (iron headband). Months later, Saitō is sent to arrest Yukishiro Enishi and he helps Kenshin fight against The Six Comrades, defeating Yatsume Mumyōi. He also fights against the first of the four Sū-shin guards of Woo Heishin, Enishi's second-in-command, and defeats him. Afterwards, Saitō is transferred to work in another location after rejecting the continuation of his duel with Kenshin. Five years after the end of series, it is revealed that Saitō continues to work for the government.

In other media

In the movie Rurouni Kenshin: The Motion Picture, Saitō is assigned by the government to stop the samurai Takimi Shigure from overthrowing the Meiji Government as an act of revenge. He also receives assistance from Himura Kenshin to protect a foreign minister from the rebels. Saitō makes an appearance in the two-part New Kyoto Arc movies, where some of his scenes and fights from the manga series are altered and removed.

Saitō also appears in both of the original video animation (OVA) series. In Rurouni Kenshin: Trust & Betrayal, his role and activities as a Shinsengumi captain during the Bakumatsu are depicted. As a result of his involvement in the Ikedaya Affair, he and his Shinsengumi comrades successfully prevent the burning of Kyoto by an extremist faction of the Ishin Shishi. His interactions with Okita Sōji as well as his first encounter with Himura Kenshin are also shown. Saitō has very brief cameo appearance in a flashback scene of Rurouni Kenshin: Reflection.

Saitō is also a playable character in the Rurouni Kenshin video games. He also appears in Jump Super Stars and Jump Ultimate Stars, but not as a playable character.

Reception 
The character of Saitō has been well received by manga readers and as the series continued he went on to become one of the most popular characters among the Rurouni Kenshin reader base, having consistently placed near the top of the Weekly Shōnen Jump character popularity polls of the series, ranking third in the last two. He has also ranked second in the "Who is Kenshin's Biggest Rival?" poll featuring all of Kenshin's opponents. Two polls by the official Rurouni Kenshin anime featured Saitō as one of the series' most popular characters. In the "Favorite Character Then" poll, Saitō was ranked third, while in the "Favorite Character Now" he was also placed third. Saitō's design initially received negative feedback from Shinsengumi fans who believed that Saitō had a more handsome face than the face Watsuki used. The author also recalled that one of the complaints criticized Saitō's selling of "Ishida powdered medicine" made by the Hijikata family, which Watsuki revealed he included as a joke. Later, Watsuki was pleased with the fact that Saitō's popularity with fans increased as the story progressed. A plethora of merchandise have been released in Saitō's likeness including figurines, keychains and wall scroll posters.

Several anime and manga publications have provided praise for Saitō. His fight scenes in the series, in particular, have also been acclaimed. While reviewing the volume 7 from the manga, Mania Entertainment writer Megan Lavey applauded the fight between Himura Kenshin and Saito Hajime at the Kamiya Dojo as the "high spot of the [Kyoto Arc] high spot". In the volume 14 review for the manga, Lavey described the end of the fight between Saitō and Usui as "very gruesome and not for the faint of heart". In the DVD volume 7 review for the anime, Mania Entertainment's Chris Beveridge described the fight scene between Saitō and Kenshin as "definitely choreographed well". He praised "the viciousness in the attacks, masked under their cold calculating facade" as being "wonderfully done, providing a real feel for these ultimate killers". His appearance in the OVAs has also received praise. Mike Crandol of Anime News Network states that during the character's brief appearances in the Rurouni Kenshin: Reflection OVA series, he appears to be "truly menacing." Mark A. Grey of Anime News Network said that the song "Hoeru Miburo (Howling Wolf of Mibu)" in the anime series "perfectly" represents the character. Reviewing the manga Restoration, Rebecca Silverman from Anime News Network felt Saitō's was interesting in regards to his philosophy as it contrasted Kenshin's but lamented his lack of appearances in this version. Daryl Surat from Otaku USA considers him as the greatest character from the series based on the impact he brings to the series during his introduction.

Nick Creamer from Anime News Network referred to Saitō as a "kind of tempter for Kenshin" due to his role in the series' first liveaction film. The Hollywood Reporter writer Clarence Sui praised Eguchi's work as Saitō during the Kyoto Inferno film during its opening scene as he confronts Shishio Makoto. For the live-action film Rurouni Kenshin: The Legend Ends, David West from Neo criticized how the character's philosophies never contrasts Kenshin's as while Saitō kills enemies, Kenshin refuses to do it and instead leaves them unconscious.

References

External links 

 Saitō Hajime at the Internet Movie Database

Anime and manga characters who can move at superhuman speeds
Anime and manga characters with superhuman strength
Comics characters introduced in 1995
Fictional assassins in comics
Fictional characters based on real people
Fictional Japanese people in anime and manga
Fictional male martial artists
Fictional police officers
Fictional samurai
Fictional secret agents and spies
Fictional swordfighters in anime and manga
Male characters in anime and manga
Martial artist characters in anime and manga
Rurouni Kenshin characters